Biljana "Biba" Golić (Serbian Cyrillic: Биљана "Биба" Голић) (born 9 November 1977) is a Serbian table tennis player.

Early career
Biba Golic began playing table tennis at age 9, becoming a member of the Serbian National Cadet team at age 12. She continued playing in the Serbia senior national system for 10 years. Biba became a two-time Yugoslavian Singles Champion.  In September 2001, she became the Mediterranean Games Champion in Women's Doubles with Gordana Plavšić. In October 2001, she became a Balkan Champion in Women's Teams, in Women's Singles, in Mixed Doubles (with Bojan Milošević), and a runner-up in Women's Doubles (with Gordana Plavšić).

In 2002, she joined the Bundes League in Germany, where she played for one year.  Biba is a member of Killerspin Krew (athletes sponsored by Killerspin).

Collegiate career
Biba attended Texas Wesleyan University for 18 months, on an athletic scholarship. At Texas Wesleyan, Biba became the National Collegiate Champion in singles, doubles, mixed doubles and team table tennis, and was also named the team's Most Valuable Player.

She transferred to the Illinois Institute of Technology, and was the No. 2 ranked NCAA women's player.

Recent career
Since becoming one of the anchors of the "Killerspin Krew", Biba has played competitively and served as a spokesperson to heighten the popularity and awareness of the sport.  Often called the "Anna Kournikova of table tennis", Biba was named as one of the "Sexiest Women in Sports" by ESPN in 2005 and appeared in ESPN's original The Body Issue.

She has regularly participated in special events, where she performs exhibition matches. She has made numerous appearances on television news and profile shows, and most recently, in Hollywood feature films.

Some of her recent film and television appearances include:
Balls of Fury
Ping Pong Playa
Welcome to the Parker
The Best Damn Sports Show Period
Spike TV - Guys Choice award winner - hottest athlete
ESPN commercial "Follow Your Sports"
Mike and Mike in the Morning

As well as being featured in publications such as Time and Rolling Stone.  The character Oksana Svedlovigoba in the story arc "Paint the Line", by Penny Arcade was based on her.

Results and accomplishments
Portland Open Champion
California Open Champion
Ohio Open Champion
US National Collegiate No. 2
US National Collegiate Champion – Singles, Doubles, Mixed Doubles & Team 2003
Yugoslavian Champion - Single (twice)
Yugoslavian Champion - Team (twice)
Yugoslavian Champion - Mixed Doubles (twice)
Balkan Champion- Mixed Doubles
Balkan Champion - Woman's Singles
Second Place Balkan - Woman's Doubles
Mediterranean Champion - Woman's Doubles
Third place - Bulgarian Open- Singles
Third place -European Junior Championships
First place - Yugoslavian TOP-12
Mediterranean Champion - Woman's Doubles

References

External links

 "Biba Golic coaches at the 2004 US National Table Tennis Championships"
 "Biba Golic photoshot at the 2007 US Open Table Tennis Tournament"
 "Biba autographs posters in the Killerspin booth"
 "Tennis Beauties vs. Ping Pong"
Biba and Elie Best Damn Sport Show Period Video
Biba - Behind the Seams
Ladies Singles - Huang Kang Kang vs. Biba Golic
USATT Player Statistics for Biba Golic

1977 births
Living people
Serbian female table tennis players
Serbian expatriate sportspeople in the United States
People from Senta

Mediterranean Games gold medalists for Serbia
Competitors at the 2005 Mediterranean Games
Mediterranean Games medalists in table tennis